Val-Saint-Gilles is a municipality in northwestern Quebec, Canada, in the Abitibi-Ouest Regional County Municipality about  north of La Sarre. It covers 109.74 km² and with a population of 157 in the Canada 2016 Census, it is the least populous incorporated municipality in the regional county.

It lies at the northern edge of the Abitibi Clay Belt. The undulating land is dotted with swamps, a few small lakes, and sand and gravel deposits. The Turgeon River, the only notable river and tributary of the Harricana River, flows through the north-western part of the municipality.

History
The first settlers, arriving circa 1935 as part of the Vautrin Settlement Plan, came from Clermont, Montreal, and Mont-Laurier. In 1937, they founded the Saint-Gilles-de-Clermont Parish, and two years later, the place separated from Clermont Township and was incorporated as the Municipality of Val-Saint-Gilles, named after Saint Giles.

But because of the harsh land, the settlers could barely make a living and many soon left, reducing the population from over 600 persons to less than 200 today. Its residents mostly commute to La Sarre and the surrounding area, working particularly in the mining and forestry sectors.

Demographics

Population

Language

Municipal council
 Mayor: Mario Richer
 Councillors: Kathy Beauchesne, Ghyslain-Guy Lavoie, Jean-Marie Lavoie, Marie-Rose Lavoie, Réal Paul, Daniel Poirier

See also
 List of municipalities in Quebec

References

Municipalities in Quebec
Incorporated places in Abitibi-Témiscamingue
Populated places established in 1939
1939 establishments in Quebec